The 2014 City of Bradford Metropolitan District Council election took place on 22 May 2014. This was on the same day as other local elections.

Results

Ward Results

Baildon ward

Bingley ward

Bingley Rural ward

Bolton and Undercliffe ward

Bowling and Barkerend ward

Bradford Moor ward

City ward

Clayton and Fairweather Green ward

Craven ward
A second seat (won by Christopher Atkinson) was contested following the death in office of Councillor Michael Kelly.

Eccleshill ward

Great Horton ward

Heaton ward

The incumbent was Imdad Hussain who had been elected for the Labour party but was suspended from the Labour Party for two years in 2012 when he failed to declare being banned as a company director. He subsequently joined the Peace Party becoming their only councillor and standing under that banner for re-election. Imdad was punched and his windscreen smashed in two separate incidents while canvassing for this election. He called for calm and said that tensions were really high.

Idle and Thackley ward

Ilkley ward

Keighley Central ward

Keighley East ward

Keighley West ward
In October 2016 Brian Morris quit UKIP and became an independent councillor.

Little Horton ward

Manningham ward

Queensbury ward
Paul Cromie was elected to represent the British National Party in 2010 but then left the party in 2011 standing as The Queensbury Ward Independents with his wife Jane Cromie who won another of the Queensbury councillor seats in 2011.

Royds ward

Shipley ward

Thornton and Allerton ward

Toller ward

Tong ward

The percentage change for the British Democratic Party (2013) candidate is compared to the British National Party candidate in the 2010 election.

Wharfedale ward

Chris Graves was the incumbent, who stood down at this election.

Wibsey ward

Windhill and Wrose ward

Worth Valley ward

Wyke ward

References

2014 English local elections
2014
2010s in West Yorkshire